Britain Stronger in Europe (formally The In Campaign Limited) was an advocacy group which campaigned in favour of the United Kingdom's continued membership of the European Union in the 2016 British referendum. It was launched at the Old Truman Brewery in London on 12 October 2015, and declared as the official "Remain" campaign for the referendum by the Electoral Commission on 13 April 2016.

In the 2016 United Kingdom European Union membership referendum, 51.9% voted in favour of leaving the EU, which meant that the Britain Stronger in Europe campaign was unsuccessful in achieving its main goal. 

Following the referendum, many of the individuals involved such as Peter Mandelson and Roland Rudd would go on to form the Open Britain campaign group. On 6 September 2016 Britain Stronger in Europe officially changed its name on Companies House to Open Britain. On 15 April 2018, Open Britain launched the People's Vote, the campaign for a second EU Referendum.

Board

The organisation's board comprises:

 Sir Danny Alexander
 Sir Brendan Barber
  Luke Graham
 Dame Janet Beer
 Baroness Brady
 Megan Dunn
 Damian Green
 Jenny Halpern
 Jude Kelly
 Caroline Lucas
 Lord Mandelson
 Trevor Phillips
 Richard Reed
 Sir Stuart Rose (chair)
 Roland Rudd
 June Sarpong
 Sir Peter Wall

The In Campaign is registered as a private limited company, registration number 09641190.

Will Straw is the executive director of the group, while Ryan Coetzee worked as director of strategy.

Affinity groups
Several groups campaigned for Britain to remain in the EU during the referendum. These include: the campaign group British Influence, the individual membership organisation the European Movement, as well as separate political parties who each had their own campaign (e.g. Labour In for Britain and Conservatives In), various special interest groups (e.g. Environmentalists for Europe), regional groups (e.g. Cambridge for Europe) and professional groups (e.g. Scientists for EU) and Brand EU.

See also
 Labour In for Britain
 Vote Leave
 Leave.EU

References

External links

 
Examples of leaflets from Britain Stronger In Europe

2015 establishments in England
Brexit–related advocacy groups in the United Kingdom
Lobbying organisations in the United Kingdom
Organisations based in the City of London
Political organisations based in London
2016 United Kingdom European Union membership referendum
Pro-Europeanism in the United Kingdom